Noel Coleman (26 November 1919 – 12 October 2007) was a RADA-trained English actor who appeared in many television roles. He appeared in the 1969 Doctor Who serial The War Games as General Smythe and he appeared in Red Dwarf as the Cat Priest in the episode "Waiting for God".

Coleman played General Webb in the BBC's eight-episode series, "The Last of the Mohicans" in 1971. Other television appearances included: Emergency – Ward 10, The Adventures of Robin Hood, Z-Cars, Dixon of Dock Green, The Avengers, Play for Today, Doctor at Large, The Top Secret Life of Edgar Briggs, The Fenn Street Gang, Sykes, Yus, My Dear, Emmerdale, The Adventures of Black Beauty, Happy Ever After, The Duchess of Duke Street, Mind Your Language, Terry and June, The New Statesman, Chancer, Lovejoy and The Detectives. His film roles included appearances in Our Miss Fred (1972), Burke & Hare (1971), Edge of Sanity (1989) and Under Suspicion (1991).

Coleman's stage work included appearances in the West End and on Broadway.

He was the narrator of Captain Pugwash.

References

External links

1919 births
2007 deaths
English male stage actors
English male television actors
People from Leicester
Male actors from Leicestershire
Alumni of RADA